Carl William Duckworth (January 25, 1955 – May 1, 2018) was an American politician. A Democrat, he served in the Utah State House of Representatives where he represented the 22nd District in Magna, Utah, from 1999–2008. He retired after being diagnosed (in late 2007) with multiple myeloma, an abnormal blood cell cancer.

Duckworth was born in Salt Lake City, Utah. Duckworth was a Latter-day Saint. He held a bachelor's degree from Boise State University. He also went to College of Eastern Utah and took electrical apprentice courses at the Salt Lake Community College. Duckworth was a heavy equipment operator.

Duckworth died of cancer on May 1, 2018 at the age of 63.

References

External links 
 Utah House of Representatives:  Carl S. Duckworth official UT House profile
 Project Vote Smart: Carl Duckworth profile
 Follow the Money: Carl Duckworth

1955 births
2018 deaths
Politicians from Salt Lake City
Deaths from multiple myeloma
Latter Day Saints from Utah
Boise State University alumni
Salt Lake Community College alumni
Utah State University Eastern alumni
Democratic Party members of the Utah House of Representatives
Deaths from cancer in Utah
Deaths from bone cancer
People from Magna, Utah